Kingsley is a civil parish and a village in the unitary authority of Cheshire West and Chester and the ceremonial county of Cheshire, England. It is approximately 5 miles south east of the town of Frodsham.

The village is home to two primary schools – Kingsley St John's Church of England Primary School and Kingsley Community Primary School.

History 

Kingsley is first listed in the Domesday Book of 1086 as Chingeslie in the Roelau Hundred. The village is listed as having been held from Earl Hugh d'Avranches by a Saxon named Dunning. It has land for two ploughs, and home to five serfs, one villein, and three bordars. It also mentioned one and a half fisheries, four hays for roe deer, and a hawk's eyrie. The earl brought the woodland of one league long and one league wide into his forest. The forest mentioned was the ancient forest of Mara and Mondrem which was greatly reduced in size subsequently and is now known as Delamere Forest.

In 1260, the village was listed as Kingisleg. The name of the village ultimately derives from "king's lea" – the meadow of the king.

The village was for a long time known for its independence, as shown in its early Quaker meeting house, as well as its siding with the Parliamentarians during the English Civil War.

Governance

Kingsley was a township in Frodsham ancient parish. It was made a separate civil parish in 1866, having been made a separate ecclesiastical parish in 1853. It was originally in Eddisbury Hundred, and after the reforms of the 19th century, became part of Runcorn Rural District. It was also in Runcorn Poor Law Union and Runcorn Sanitary District until 1974, and in the borough of Vale Royal from 1974 to 2009.

An electoral ward in the same name exists. This stretches from Sutton in the north to Norley in the south. The total population of this ward taken at the 2011 Census was 4,222.

Religion

Until the 19th century, the local parish church was that of St Laurence, at Overton in nearby Frodsham. In 1851 the red sandstone Anglican Church of St John the Evangelist was consecrated, having been built to a design of George Gilbert Scott, and in 1853 it became the village's parish church.

The current Methodist chapel, Hurst Methodist Chapel, was built in 1871. Between 1864 and 1967 there was a second Methodist chapel, Brookside Methodist Chapel.

Demography

Population 
 1801: 661
 1851: 1067
 1901: 1066
 1951: 1503
 2001: 2026
 2011: 1986

Notable residents 
Paula Radcliffe
Bob Carolgees
Emily Speed
Luke Browning

Transport 

The nearest railway station is 3 miles away at Acton Bridge on the West Coast mainline for trains to Liverpool and Birmingham and links, via Runcorn and Crewe to intercity services. Delamere railway station is 3.1 miles away with services to Northwich, Manchester and Chester. Alternatively, there is Frodsham railway station which is 3.2 miles away for services to Manchester, Chester and North Wales. By 2018 there will be services once again to Liverpool from Frodsham.

Community

Kingsley is home to a number of community services including a community centre, The Kingsley Village Institute, Kingsley Cricket Club, Kingsley Youth Group (formerly KU17's), Scouts (Beavers, Cubs & Scouts) and Guide groups and The Kingsley Players, an amateur dramatic society.

As well as a website there is a village Facebook group for advertising and discussing local events

The village prints and distributes its own newsletter, The Kingsley News, which is published every month (except August).

Kingsley Cricket Club

The Cricket Club has two senior teams playing in the Meller Braggins Cheshire Cricket League, a Sunday XI, and a midweek team (The Kingsley Knights) playing in the Chester and District Midweek Cricket League. The club has a junior division with U18, U15, U13, U11 and U9 squads playing fixtures throughout the summer.

See also

Listed buildings in Kingsley, Cheshire
Kingsley Castle
Crewood Hall

References

Notes

Bibliography

External links

Villages in Cheshire
Civil parishes in Cheshire